Brampton railway station serves the village of Brampton in Norfolk and is operated by the Bure Valley Railway, a narrow gauge heritage railway operation.

Route

Heritage railway stations in Norfolk